The 2018 División Profesional season (officially the Copa de Primera TIGO-Visión Banco 2018 for sponsorship reasons) was the 84th season of top-flight professional football in Paraguay. The season began on 2 February and ended on 8 December. Cerro Porteño were the defending champions.

In the Torneo Apertura, Olimpia won their forty-first league title with two matches to spare following a 2–1 win over Libertad on 30 May. Olimpia also clinched their forty-second league title in the Torneo Clausura with two matches to spare after beating Guaraní 4–1 on 28 November.

Teams

Stadia and locations

Note: Teams occasionally play their home games at Estadio Defensores del Chaco in Asunción. Derbies between Cerro Porteño and Olimpia are also played at this stadium.
a: Deportivo Santaní played their Torneo Apertura home match against Olimpia at Estadio Antonio Aranda in Ciudad del Este instead of their regular stadium Estadio Juan José Vázquez in San Estanislao.
b: Guaraní played their home games at Estadio Defensores del Chaco in Asunción until mid-May while their regular stadium Estadio Rogelio Livieres underwent maintenance works. Guaraní played their Torneo Apertura home match against Olimpia at Estadio Antonio Aranda in Ciudad del Este.

Managerial changes

Torneo Apertura
The Campeonato de Apertura, named "Centenario del Estadio Defensores del Chaco", was the 117th official championship of the Primera División and the first championship of the 2018 season. It started on February 2 and concluded on June 10.

Standings

Results

Top goalscorers

Source: APF, Soccerway

Torneo Clausura
The Campeonato de Clausura, named "Dr. Gerónimo Angulo Gastón", was the 118th official championship of the Primera División and the second championship of the 2018 season. It started on July 17 and concluded on December 8.

Standings

Results

Top goalscorers

Source: APF , Soccerway

Aggregate table

Relegation
Relegation is determined at the end of the season by computing an average of the number of points earned per game over the past three seasons. The two teams with the lowest average were relegated to the División Intermedia for the following season.

 Source: APF

References

External links
APF's official website 

Paraguay
1
Paraguayan Primera División seasons